The following elections occurred in the year 1996.

 1995–1996 Azerbaijani parliamentary election
 1996 Beninese presidential election
 1996 Comorian presidential election
 1996 New Zealand general election
 1996 Nicaraguan general election
 1996 Samoan general election
 1996 Tongan general election

Africa
 1996 Cape Verdean presidential election
 1996 Chadian presidential election
 1996 Comorian legislative election
 1996 Equatorial Guinean presidential election
 1996 Gabonese legislative election
 1996 Gambian presidential election
 1996 Ghanaian presidential election
 1996 Malagasy presidential election
 1996 Mauritanian parliamentary election
 1996 Nigerien parliamentary election
 1996 Nigerien presidential election
 1996 Ghanaian parliamentary election
 1996 Sierra Leonean general election
 1996 Sudanese general election
 1996 São Tomé and Príncipe presidential election
 1996 Ugandan parliamentary election
 1996 Ugandan presidential election
 1996 Zambian general election
 1996 Zimbabwean presidential election

Asia
 1996 Autonomous Region in Muslim Mindanao general election
 1996 Bangladeshi general election
 February 1996 Bangladeshi general election
 June 1996 Bangladeshi general election
 1996 Hong Kong Chief Executive election
 1996 Hong Kong Provisional Legislature election
 1996 Iranian legislative election
 1996 Israeli legislative election
 1996 Israeli prime ministerial election
 1996 Japanese general election
 1996 Kuwaiti general election
 1996 Palestinian general election
 1996 Philippine Sangguniang Kabataan election
 1996 Republic of China National Assembly election (Taiwan)
 1996 Republic of China presidential election (Taiwan)
 1996 Sarawak state election
 1996 South Korean legislative election
 1996 Thai general election

India
 Indian general election in Haryana, 1996
 Indian general election in Tamil Nadu, 1996
 1996 Indian general election
 1996 Tamil Nadu legislative assembly election

Russia
 Elections in Astrakhan Oblast
 Krasnodar Krai Head of Administration elections
 1996 Russian presidential election

Australia
 1996 Australian federal election
 1996 Blaxland by-election
 1996 Clarence state by-election
 1996 Lindsay by-election
 1996 Mundingburra state by-election
 1996 Orange state by-election
 1996 Pittwater state by-election
 1996 Port Macquarie state by-election
 1996 Southern Highlands state by-election
 1996 Strathfield state by-election
 1996 Tasmanian state election
 1996 Victorian state election
 1996 Western Australian state election

Europe
 1996 Abkhazian parliamentary election
 Albania: 
 1996 Albanian parliamentary election
 1996 Albanian local elections
 1996 Armenian presidential election
 1995–1996 Azerbaijani parliamentary election
 1996 Belarusian referendum
 Bulgarian presidential election
 1996 Cypriot legislative election
 1996 Czech legislative election
 1996 Gibraltar general election
 1996 Greek legislative election
 1996 Icelandic presidential election
 1996 Italian general election
 Italian general election, 1996 (Veneto)
 1996 Jersey general election
 1996 Lithuanian parliamentary election
 1996 Maltese general election
 1996 Montenegrin parliamentary election
 1996 Portuguese presidential election
 1996 Portuguese regional elections
 1996 Romanian presidential election
 1996 Romanian legislative election

Austria
 1996 Burgenland state election
 1996 European Parliament election in Austria

European Parliament
After 1995 enlargement of the European Union: 
 1996 European Parliament election in Austria
 1996 European Parliament election in Finland

Germany
 1996 Rhineland-Palatinate state election
 1996 Baden-Württemberg state election (de) 
 1996 Schleswig-Holstein state election (de)

Moldova
 1996 Moldovan presidential election
 1996 Transnistrian presidential election

Russia
 Elections in Astrakhan Oblast
 Krasnodar Krai Head of Administration elections
 1996 Russian presidential election

Spain
 1996 Spanish general election

United Kingdom
 1996 Barnsley East by-election
 1996 Hemsworth by-election
 1996 South East Staffordshire by-election

United Kingdom local
 1996 United Kingdom local elections

English local
 1996 Manchester Council election
 1996 Stevenage Council election
 1996 Trafford Council election
 1996 Wolverhampton Council election

Japan
 1996 Japanese general election

North America
 1996–1997 Belizean municipal elections

Canada
 1996 British Columbia general election
 1996 Newfoundland general election
 1996 Ontario Liberal Party leadership election
 1996 Prince Edward Island Liberal Party leadership election
 1996 Progressive Conservative Party of Prince Edward Island leadership election
 1996 Prince Edward Island general election
 1996 Vancouver municipal election
 1996 Yukon general election

Caribbean
 1996 Montserratian general election
 1996 Tobago House of Assembly election
 1996 Trinidad and Tobago local election

United States
 1996 United States elections
 1996 United States presidential election
 1996 United States Senate elections
 1996 United States gubernatorial elections

United States gubernatorial
 1996 Delaware gubernatorial election
 1996 United States gubernatorial elections
 1996 Washington gubernatorial election

Alabama
 United States Senate election in Alabama, 1996

Arizona
 United States presidential election in Arizona, 1996

Arkansas
 United States presidential election in Arkansas, 1996

California
 1996 California State Assembly elections
 1996 California state elections
 1996 San Francisco Board of Supervisors elections
 1996 California State Senate elections
 United States House of Representatives elections in California, 1996

Delaware
 1996 Delaware gubernatorial election
 United States Senate election in Delaware, 1996

Georgia
 United States House of Representatives elections in Georgia, 1996
 United States Senate election in Georgia, 1996

Idaho
 United States Senate election in Idaho, 1996

Illinois
 United States Senate election in Illinois, 1996

Kansas
 United States Senate election in Kansas, 1996

Louisiana
 United States Senate election in Louisiana, 1996

Maine
 United States Senate election in Maine, 1996
 United States presidential election in Maine, 1996

Montana
 United States Senate election in Montana, 1996

North Carolina
 1996 North Carolina judicial elections
 1996 North Carolina lieutenant gubernatorial election
 1996 North Carolina Council of State elections
 1996 North Carolina gubernatorial election
 United States House of Representatives elections in North Carolina, 1996
 United States Senate election in North Carolina, 1996
 United States presidential election in North Carolina, 1996

Oregon
 United States Senate special election in Oregon, 1996

Puerto Rico
 1996 Puerto Rican general election

South Carolina
 United States House of Representatives elections in South Carolina, 1996

Tennessee
 United States Senate election in Tennessee, 1996

United States House of Representatives
 United States House of Representatives elections in Georgia, 1996
 United States House of Representatives elections in South Carolina, 1996
 United States House of Representatives elections in California, 1996
 1996 United States House of Representatives elections

United States Senate
 1996 United States Senate elections
 United States Senate election in Georgia, 1996
 United States Senate election in Alabama, 1996
 United States Senate election in Alaska, 1996
 United States Senate election in Arkansas, 1996
 United States Senate election in Colorado, 1996
 United States Senate election in Delaware, 1996
 United States Senate election in Idaho, 1996
 United States Senate election in Illinois, 1996
 United States Senate election in Iowa, 1996
 United States Senate election in Kansas, 1996
 United States Senate election in Kentucky, 1996
 United States Senate election in Louisiana, 1996
 United States Senate election in Maine, 1996
 United States Senate election in Massachusetts, 1996
 United States Senate election in Minnesota, 1996
 United States Senate election in Mississippi, 1996
 United States Senate election in Montana, 1996
 United States Senate election in Nebraska, 1996
 United States Senate election in New Jersey, 1996
 United States Senate election in North Carolina, 1996
 United States Senate special election in Oregon, 1996
 United States Senate election in Oregon, 1996
 United States Senate election in Rhode Island, 1996
 United States Senate election in South Carolina, 1996
 United States Senate election in South Dakota, 1996
 United States Senate election in Tennessee, 1996
 United States Senate election in Virginia, 1996
 United States Senate election in Wyoming, 1996

Utah
 United States presidential election in Utah, 1996

Virginia
 United States Senate election in Virginia, 1996

Washington (U.S. state)
 1996 Washington gubernatorial election

West Virginia
 United States Senate election in West Virginia, 1996

Wyoming
 United States Senate election in Wyoming, 1996

Oceania
 1996 Niuean general election
 1996 Samoan general election
 1996 Tongan general election

Australia
 1996 Australian federal election
 1996 Blaxland by-election
 1996 Clarence state by-election
 1996 Lindsay by-election
 1996 Mundingburra state by-election
 1996 Orange state by-election
 1996 Pittwater state by-election
 1996 Port Macquarie state by-election
 1996 Southern Highlands state by-election
 1996 Strathfield state by-election
 1996 Tasmanian state election
 1996 Victorian state election
 1996 Western Australian state election

New Zealand

New Zealand general
 1996 New Zealand general election

New Zealand general
 1996 New Zealand general election

South America
 1996 Ecuadorian general election

See also

 
1996
Elections